Pampāļu Parish is an administrative territorial entity of Saldus Municipality, Latvia.

Towns, villages and settlements of Pampāļu Parish

References 

Parishes of Latvia
Saldus Municipality
Courland